Balashovia is a genus of oncocerid nautiloids from the Middle Devonian, (lower Eifelian), included in the Archiacoceratidae, a family characterized by compressed, exogastric, cyrtocones with a large, actinosiphonate, dorsal siphuncle.

References

The Paleobiology Database Balashovia entry accessed 8/21/12
Sepkoski J.J. List of Cephalopod Genera 
Walter C. Sweet, 1964.  Nautiloidea - Oncocerida. Treatise on Invertebrate Paleontology, Part K, 1964.

Prehistoric nautiloid genera